The Chesapeake rebellion of 1730 was the largest slave rebellion of the colonial period in North America. Believing that Virginian planters had disregarded a royal edict from King George II which freed slaves, two hundred slaves gathered in Princess Anne County, Virginia, in October, electing captains and demanding that Governor Gooch honor the royal edict. White planters stopped these meetings, arresting some slaves and forcing others to flee. Although hundreds of slaves fled to the Great Dismal Swamp, they were immediately hunted down by the authorities and their Pasquotank allies.

Causes

Rumor of Royal Emancipation 

In the early fall of 1730, a rumor spread among African slaves that King George II of Great Britain had issued an order to free all baptized slaves in the American colonies. The exact source of the rumor was unknown, but it was believed to originate among slaves since colonial officials were not able to explain its origin and no such order had been issued.  James Blair, the commissary of the Virginia Colony, described the cause of rebellion as following in his letter to Bishop of London, Edmund Gibson: "There was a general rumor among them that they were to be set free. And when they saw nothing of it they grew angry and saucy, and met in the night time in great numbers, and talked of rising."

Religious incentives
In 1724, in response to a questionnaire sent by Bishop of London on the conversion of infidels, eleven out of twenty-eight of the respondents noted that they were interested in obtaining slave conversions. Despite a relatively-high portion of Anglican clergymen expressed interest in bringing African slaves into Anglican churches, baptized Africans were not treated equally in comparison to whites in even the most aggressive clergyman's parish in order to maintain the hierarchical relationship between masters and slaves. Baptized slaves believed that slavery was not compatible with Christianity, triggering rebellion.

Spanish sanctuary 

As early as 1693, Spain offered sanctuary in Spanish Florida to fugitive slaves from the Thirteen Colonies who converted to Catholicism. However, news of this policy did not spread northward until the late 1730s, but still inspired many enslaved Africans from North Carolina to Boston to seek freedom in Spanish Florida. Spain would keep this policy in place for as long as it held the territory, only amending it to remove any compensation to owners of runaway slaves and stipulate that fugitive slaves had to serve a four-year term of service to the colonial militia.

Background

Religion 
The European Enlightenment led to increased religious revival in both Europe and the United States. Colonists embraced both deism and Pietism, as introduced by European migrants in the early 16th century. Religious revivalism and the Great Awakening forced colonists to rethink worship and also kindled greater interest in the conversion of slaves. Many slave owners at the time feared that a slave's conversion to Christianity could infringe on property rights as referring to chattel slavery, and slaves themselves hoped that Christianity might lead to their freedom. However, beginning in the 1660s the Virginia legislature repeatedly passed laws that confirmed that conversion to Christianity did not change a slave's hereditary status.

Although slaves sought to gain freedom after converting to Christianity, slave-holders and colonial officials did not share the same opinion. In September 1667, the Virginia officials passed the following law to prevent baptized slaves from gaining freedom:

In the years leading up to 1730, slaveholders had failed to convince converted slaves that Christianity was compatible with slavery. Therefore, those aforementioned practices of inequality outraged baptized slaves, and they planned their insurrection on a Sunday morning in October, when the whites were attending church meetings.

Native Americans and Fugitive Slave Clause 
The rebellion was successfully suppressed in a short time period due to help from indigenous tribes. Since early 1700s, concerns of slave insurrection led colonial officials to seek help from Native Americans. Attempts were made many times with different outcomes. The Haudenosaunee had long been asked by colonial officials to return the fugitive Blacks that they had heard were among them, but without result; the Iroquois stated many times that returning fugitives was not part of their jurisdiction. On the other hand, the Cherokee agreed to the fugitive slave clause in a treaty signed in 1730 with representatives of the Commissioners for Trade and Plantations.

Demographic 
The majority of slaves imported were between 10 and 24 years old, 14 percent were children, 30 percent were young women and 56 percent were young men. The slave population made up around 25 percent of the general population. This created an imbalance in both the age and gender demographic as older slaves were seldom sold, and the number of male to female slaves was almost 2 to 1. The annual amount of new slaves imported in a year was between 2,000 and 4,000.

Treatment 
Upon arrival slaves were drained both mentally and physically from their trek across Africa and the Middle Passage. Planters sought to break their spirits even further by stripping them of all ties to their homeland and native culture. This was done by giving them new names, making them do the most repetitive and backbreaking work, and paying little attention to their basic needs like food, shelter, and clothing. Slaves were also often separated from their families and friends leaving them alone and isolated due to language barriers between overseers and other slaves.

Aftermath 
Fleeing through the Great Dismal Swamp, the slaves faced confrontation by the local native groups, who assisted in the capture of many of the participants. The aftermath 1730 rebellion greatly reduced efforts for large-scale insurrections, as increased slave surveillance limited their ability to organize, and for many years after slave owners opposed religious conversion or gatherings out of fear such gatherings could spark more revolts. Despite this, religious upheaval in the colonies, much sponsored by George Whitefield, encouraged slave owners to allow their slaves to attend services and join various churches by the early 1740s.

References

Slave rebellions in the United States
1730 in North America